Exchange Quay is a tram stop on the Eccles Line of Greater Manchester's light rail Metrolink system. It is located in the Salford Quays area, in North West England, and opened on 12 June 1999 as part of Phase 2 of the system's expansion. The stop serves the Exchange Quay office complex and the surrounding area. It is also often used as a stop for Old Trafford football stadium.

Exchange Quay
The station serves the Exchange Quay office complex in Salford Quays and the surrounding area. The complex, owned by Hunter Property Fund Management, consists of six office buildings, a gym, several car parks, and a retail area. Due to the station's close proximity to Old Trafford football stadium, it is frequently used on match-days by fans travelling on the Eccles and MediaCityUK services.

Services

Service pattern
12 minute service to Etihad Campus (peak).
12 minute service to MediaCityUK (peak).
12 minute service to Eccles (via MediaCityUK at offpeak times).
12 minute service to Ashton-under-Lyne.

Connecting bus routes
Exchange Quay station is served by bus stops on the nearby Trafford Road. Diamond Bus North West service 79 and Go North West Orbits 53 which runs to Pendleton and to Cheetham Hill via Rusholme, Gorton and Harpurhey operate from these stops.

References

External links

Exchange Quay Stop Information
Exchange Quay area map

Tram stops in Salford
Tram stops on the Eccles to Piccadilly line
Tram stops on the MediaCityUK to Cornbrook line
Salford Quays